Gary L. Clingman (born September 21, 1951) is a former Associate Justice of the New Mexico Supreme Court.

Education

Clingman received his Bachelor of Arts from the University of Texas of the Permian Basin and his Juris Doctor from Texas Tech University School of Law.

Legal career

He served as an attorney for a private firm for more than 12 years.

State judicial service

Clingman was appointed as a district judge in 1997. He was the Chief Judge of the Fifth Judicial District from 2006–2018.

Teaching career

Clingman has served as an instructor and facilitator at the National Judicial College in Reno, Nevada, and is pursuing his postgraduate degree in Judicial Studies at the University of Nevada, Reno.

Service on New Mexico Supreme Court

In April 2018 Clingman was one of two names submitted to the governor to fill the seat vacated by the retirement of Justice Edward L. Chávez. On April 6, 2018 Governor Susana Martinez announced his appointment to the New Mexico Supreme Court. He was sworn in on April 30, 2018. His term ended on December 31, 2018.

Personal life

Clingman is a registered Republican.

References

External links

Profile on New Mexico Supreme Court website

Living people
1951 births
20th-century American judges
21st-century American judges
New Mexico Republicans
New Mexico state court judges
Justices of the New Mexico Supreme Court
People from Hobbs, New Mexico
Texas Tech University School of Law alumni
University of Texas Permian Basin alumni